The Agawam Group is a geologic group in Connecticut. It preserves fossils dating back to the Jurassic period.

See also

 List of fossiliferous stratigraphic units in Connecticut

References
 

Geologic groups of Connecticut